Hyastenus borradailei, sometimes called white-v hydroid spider crab, is a small crustacean belonging to the Epialtidae family. It is native to the Indo-Pacific.

References

Majoidea
Crustaceans of the Indian Ocean
Crustaceans of the Pacific Ocean
Crustaceans described in 1907
Taxa named by Mary J. Rathbun